Saint-Rome-de-Tarn (literally Saint-Rome of Tarn; Languedocien: Sant Roma de Tarn) is a commune in the Aveyron department in southern France.

Population

See also
Communes of the Aveyron department

References

Communes of Aveyron
Aveyron communes articles needing translation from French Wikipedia